Simarjit Singh Gill (born 1961) is the District Attorney for Salt Lake County, Utah, first elected to the office in November 2010.

Career
Before his District Attorney election, Sim Gill worked as Salt Lake City's Chief Prosecutor. Sim Gill was elected as the Salt Lake County District Attorney in November 2010, by defeating incumbent Lohra Miller, after losing the race to her in 2006. As a veteran prosecutor, Sim has championed issues of therapeutic justice, criminal prosecution, and alternatives to prosecution.

On March 18, 2014, Gill announced his bid for a second term, and in November of the same year, defeated Republican challenger Steve Nelson, retaining his position as the District Attorney. In 2018, Gill announced that he would run for a third term, and in November of the same year, defeated challenger Nathan Evershed.

Sim has collaborated on the creation and implementation of various therapeutic justice programs, including Mental Health Court, Veterans Court, Salt Lake City Domestic Violence Court, Misdemeanor Drug Court and the Salt Lake Area Family Justice Center.

Education and election
In 2010, Gill became the District Attorney by defeating the incumbent Lohra Miller after losing to her in 2006. On March 18, 2014, Gill announced his bid for a second term  and in November of the same year, defeated the Republican challenger Steve Nelson to retain his position as the District Attorney. Before becoming the District Attorney, Gill worked as Salt Lake City's Chief Prosecutor.

Gill graduated from the University of Utah with a B.A. degree in History and Philosophy. He received his J. D. degree and certificate of specialization in Environmental and Natural Resources Law from Northwestern School of Law at Lewis and Clark College in Portland, Oregon. Gill was admitted to the Utah Bar in 1993.

Prominent cases
Gill participated in the prosecution of Brian David Mitchell, the man guilty of kidnapping Elizabeth Smart. He filed felony corruption and bribery charges against Utah Attorneys General Mark Shurtleff and John Swallow in 2014. Charges against Shurtleff were dropped in 2016, and Swallow was found not guilty of all charges in 2017.

In July 2020 Gill ruled that the killing of Bernardo Palacios-Carbajal, in which officers Neil Iverson and Kevin Fortuna fired 34 shots, was justified. A crowd gathered at the District Attorney’s office to protest Gill’s decision, which eventually led to vandalism of the DA’s office as well as the surrounding road. Gill charged 7 protestors with "gang enhancement" crimes which carry sentences up to life in prison.

References

1961 births
Living people
Lawyers from Salt Lake City
District attorneys in Utah
Utah Democrats
Lewis & Clark Law School alumni
University of Utah alumni
American politicians of Indian descent
Indian emigrants to the United States